Samantha K. Huge is the former director of athletics for the College of William & Mary. She previously served as an associate athletic director at Texas A&M University from 2014 to 2017, as a deputy athletic director at the University of Delaware from 2009 to 2014, as an associate athletic director at Georgetown University from 2006 to 2009, and as an assistant athletic director at Wake Forest University from 2002 to 2006. Huge attended college at Gordon College, where she played on the school's women's basketball team. 

Huge was named athletic director at the College of William & Mary on March 14, 2017. Huge fired Men's Basketball Coach Tony Shaver in March of 2019 after a 14-17 season, although William & Mary will continue paying Shaver's contract through June 2024. Samantha Huge hired Coach Dane Fischer in April 2019 as the new Men's Basketball Coach. The William & Mary Men's Basketball Team went on to have a 5-27 record under Coach Dane Fischer for the 2021-2022 season. On October 6, 2020, Huge resigned amid controversy after having cut seven athletic programs and being caught plagiarizing much of a public email from a similar Stanford University press release during the announcement of the program cuts.

References

External links
 

Living people
William & Mary Tribe athletic directors
Gordon College (Massachusetts) alumni
Campbell University alumni
Women college athletic directors in the United States
Year of birth missing (living people)